All's Fair in Love is a 1921 American silent romantic comedy film directed by E. Mason Hopper and starring May Collins, Richard Dix and Raymond Hatton. It was produced and distributed by Goldwyn Pictures. It is based on the 1913 Broadway play The Bridal Path by Thompson Buchanan.

Cast
 May Collins as 	Natalie Marshall
 Richard Dix as Bobby Cameron
 Marcia Manon as 	Vera
 Raymond Hatton as 	Craigh Randolph
 Stuart Holmes as 	Rogers
 Andrew Robson as Marshall

References

Bibliography
 Munden, Kenneth White. The American Film Institute Catalog of Motion Pictures Produced in the United States, Part 1. University of California Press, 1997.

External links
 

1920s American films
1921 films
1921 comedy films
1920s English-language films
American silent feature films
American comedy films
American black-and-white films
Films directed by E. Mason Hopper
Goldwyn Pictures films
American films based on plays